Pieter Groenhart (February 21, 1894 – November 3, 1965) was a Dutch lichenologist known for his research into tropical Asian lichens. Born in Ilpendam, he became a teacher in 1916 and taught in several local elementary schools. In 1926 he moved to Java, where he became a teacher at the Agricultural School in Malang, from 1926 to 1932. Soon after, he studied biology at the University of Utrecht (1932–1935), and then started to study lichens at the Rijksherbarium in Leiden, from 1935 to 1936. He returned to teaching in Malang until 1940, when he was transferred to a Government school at present-day Bogor.

In 1942, Groehnhart was imprisoned in an internment camp, where he stayed until his release in 1945. After returning to the Netherlands, he continued his studies of lichens, becoming especially interested in the genus Cryptothecia.

Species named in his honor include Ocellularia groenhartii (Hale 1975), Cryptothecia groenhartii (Makhija & Patw. 1994), and Rinodina groenhartii (H.Mayrhofer 1984).

Selected publications
Groenhart, P. (1962). "Agaothecium Groenh., a new lichen genus from Malaysia". Persoonia 2: 349–353.
Groenhart, P. (1965). "Studies in ascostromatic lichen-fungi. I. The problem of Ascohymeniales and Ascoloculares". Persoonia 4 (1): 1–7.
Groenhart, P. (1965). "Studies in ascostromatic lichen-fungi. II. Types of ascostromata". Persoonia 4 (1): 9–13.

See also
:Category:Taxa named by Pieter Groenhart
List of mycologists

References

1894 births
1965 deaths
Dutch lichenologists
People from Waterland
Utrecht University alumni